Count Christian of Nassau-Siegen (16 July 1616 – 1/11 April 1644), official titles: Graf zu Nassau, Katzenelnbogen, Vianden und Diez, Herr zu Beilstein, was a count from the House of Nassau-Siegen, a cadet branch of the Ottonian Line of the House of Nassau. He served as an officer in the Hessian Army and the Imperial Army successively.

Biography

The will and testament of Count John VII ‘the Middle’ of 1621 bequeathed John Maurice and his younger brothers from their father’s second marriage the district of Freudenberg, some villages in the Haingericht and a third part of the administration of the city of Siegen.

Christian studied in Leiden in 1631. He attended the Siege of Maastricht in 1632. In 1633 he entered the Hessian service. He was wounded in the fight for Hanau in 1636. In 1642 he entered the imperial service and became colonel of the cuirassiers. At a hitherto unknown time his body was transferred to Siegen to be interred in the  there.

Marriage
Christian married around 1641 to Anna Barbara von Quadt-Landskron-Rheinbach (from the noble family ). The marriage remained childless.

Ancestors

Notes

References

Sources
 
 
 
 
 
 
 
 
 
 
 
 
 
  (1994). "Die nassauischen Begräbnisstätten in der ev. Stadtkirche zu Dillenburg". In:  (Hg.), 650 Jahre Stadt Dillenburg. Ein Text- und Bildband zum Stadtrechtsjubiläum der Oranierstadt (in German). Dillenburg: Verlag E. Weidenbach GmbH + Co. KG. p. 119–125.
  (2004). "Die Fürstengruft zu Siegen und die darin von 1669 bis 1781 erfolgten Beisetzungen". In:  u.a. (Redaktion), Siegener Beiträge. Jahrbuch für regionale Geschichte (in German). Vol. 9. Siegen: Geschichtswerkstatt Siegen – Arbeitskreis für Regionalgeschichte e.V. p. 183–202.
  (1994). "Beisetzungen in den 15 Grabstellen der Dillenburger Nassauergruft". In:  (Hg.), 650 Jahre Stadt Dillenburg. Ein Text- und Bildband zum Stadtrechtsjubiläum der Oranierstadt (in German). Dillenburg: Verlag E. Weidenbach GmbH + Co. KG. p. 115–118.
  (1979). "Genealogische gegevens". In:  (red.), Nassau en Oranje in de Nederlandse geschiedenis (in Dutch). Alphen aan den Rijn: A.W. Sijthoff. p. 40–44, 224–228. .
 
 
  (1882). Het vorstenhuis Oranje-Nassau. Van de vroegste tijden tot heden (in Dutch). Leiden: A.W. Sijthoff/Utrecht: J.L. Beijers.

External links

 Nassau. In: Medieval Lands. A prosopography of medieval European noble and royal families, compiled by Charles Cawley.
 Nassau Part 5. In: An Online Gotha, by Paul Theroff.

1616 births
1644 deaths
German Calvinist and Reformed Christians
German military officers
German people of the Thirty Years' War
Christian of Nassau-Siegen
Military personnel of the Thirty Years' War
Military personnel from Siegen
17th-century German people